Rosa 'Europeana' is a dark red Floribunda rose cultivar. It was created by de Ruiter Innovations in Belgium in 1963. It was named an All-America Rose Selections in 1968.

History
'Europeana' was created by de Ruiter Innovations in 1963. The stock parents of this rose are the Floribunda cultivars, 'Ruth Leuwerik' and 'Rosemary Rose'. The plant was introduced into Australia by Roy H. Rumsey Pty. Ltd. in 1965 as 'Europeana'.

Description
'Europeana' is a short, vigorous bushy shrub, 2 to 3 ft (60–91 cm) in height, with a 2 to 3 ft (60-91 cm)spread. Blooms are small, 2 to 3 in (6—9 cm) in diameter. Blooms are semi-double in form, and are borne on flat-topped clusters of 10 to 30 petals. The rose has a mild fragrance. The double to full, dark red petals are rosette-shaped and are long lasting. New leaves are dark red, and later turn dark green and glossy. The shrub heat tolerant and a repeat bloomer.

Child plants

 Rosa 'All Ablaze', Tom Carruth, (2000) 
 Rosa 'Hanagasumi', (1985) 
Rosa 'Morgenrot', Kordes, (1983),    
Rosa 'Royal Occasion', (1974)  
Rosa 'Tornado', Kordes,(1973) 
Rosa 'Watercolors Home Run', Tom Carruth, 2012

Awards
 The Hague Gold Medal, (1962) 
 All-America Rose Selections winner, USA, (1968)
 Portland Gold Medal, (1970)

See also
Garden roses
Rose Hall of Fame
List of Award of Garden Merit roses

Notes

References

Europeana
Products introduced in 1968